Ila Mae McAfee (October 21, 1897 or 1900 – April 18, 1995),  also known as Ila McAfee Turner, was an American painter, muralist, illustrator and author. She was born in or near Gunnison, Colorado and known for her miniatures and as an animalier and muralist.  She is best remembered for her paintings of horses, Western themes, landscapes, and portraits of Pueblos.

McAfee studied at Western State Colorado College, at the Art Students League, the National Academy of Design and with James E. McBurney in Chicago.

During the Depression McAfee created post office murals through the Section of Painting and Sculpture in Gunnison, Colorado, Clifton, Texas, Cordell, Oklahoma and Edmond, Oklahoma. As a tribute to her mother-in-law, Edith Turner, McAfee presented three murals to the public library of Greeley, Colorado, where Mrs. Turner had served as Assistant Librarian for many years.

McAfee was the author and illustrator of Indians, Horses, Hills, Et Cetera and the illustrator for Historic Costume: A Resume of Style and Fashion From Remote Times to the Nineteen Seventies by Katherine Morris Lester.

Ila met her husband, painter Elmer Page Turner, when they were both art students in Chicago. They were married in 1926 and moved to Taos, New Mexico in 1928.  Both are buried in the Santa Fe National Cemetery in Santa Fe, New Mexico.

In 1981 she was designated Taos Artist of the Year.

References

Year of birth uncertain
1995 deaths
American muralists
American women painters
20th-century American painters
Artists from Taos, New Mexico
Art Students League of New York alumni
Painters from Colorado
20th-century American women artists
Artists of the American West
Section of Painting and Sculpture artists
People from Gunnison, Colorado
Western Colorado University alumni
National Academy of Design alumni
Women muralists
Public Works of Art Project artists
Burials at Santa Fe National Cemetery